Abbey Green may refer to:

 Abbey Green (footballer), an Australian rules football player
 Abbey Green, Shropshire, England
 Abbey Green, Staffordshire Moorlands, Staffordshire, England
 Abbey Green ward, a former electoral ward of Stoke-on-Trent, Staffordshire, England
 Lesmahagow, a town in Scotland
 Abbeygreen Church, a church in the town of Lesmahagow, Scotland.